Galaxias oliros, the obscure galaxias, is a galaxiid of the genus Galaxias, a member of the Mountain Galaxias species complex group of freshwater fish, found in Australia.

Description
Upper surface evenly arched from the nape to the beginning of the tail fin, the belly follows a similar profile but less pronounced. Caudal peduncle is relatively shallow and strongly laterally compressed. Head medium sized, noticeably wider than deep and slightly to moderately wedge-shaped when viewed from the side. Eyes relatively large and set high on the head. Mouth positioned at the end of the snout, medium sized with a shorter lower jaw.

Fins fleshy at the base, less so in paired fins.  Anal fin has a long base whereas the dorsal fin base is short.  Fins rounded, dorsal fin medium length, anal fin about 10-20 percent longer than the dorsal fin.  Leading edge of the anal fin usually at a position about half way along the dorsal fin base.  Pelvic fins medium sized, and positioned low at about the mid point of the body with the anal fin positioned half way between the pelvic fins and the tail.  Pectoral fins medium sized, rounded to paddle shaped, positioned low on the body with the upper edge even with or slightly higher than the rear end of the mouth.  Tail fin is moderately long, weakly forked and usually longer than the caudal peduncle.  Flanges medium height and length and quite well developed on the caudal peduncle, often extending as far forward as the rear of the anal fin.

Galaxias oliruos is mainly olive to grey-brown over the back and sides extending over the head and snout, fading to cream or white to silvery below the lateral line and silvery on the belly.  The base colour is overlaid with a pattern of small to medium sized dark irregularly shaped blotches with many joining up to form uneven vertical bands.  These markings are more closely spaced over the upper surface including the nape but are not present on the head and snout and sometimes are very faint.  Sometimes a medium thick row of copper to gold spots extends over the upper surface from the nape to the dorsal fin and occasionally there may be a slight scattering of small gold flecks over the head and snout.  The gill covers are translucent with a large gold to silver or turquoise patch.  Fins light grey to olive and translucent.

Distribution

The fish is also recorded from coastal drainages in western Victoria including the Corangamite Basin, the Hopkins River and extending through to Mosquito Creek within the Bool Lagoon catchment in South Australia. Additionally, the fish is found very close to the sea in the Merri River and the Darlot/Fitzroy River systems in western Victoria.

Habitat
Juveniles are often found in shallow riffle zones around the edges of pools with adults in deeper pools  and more open areas. Usually found taking cover in heavy macrophytes or woody debris, but sometimes found in open water or near the surface. Can be very abundant in swamps.

Lifecycle/Reproduction
The obscure galaxias lives its entire lifecycle in freshwater.  It has high tolerance for water conditions being found in very turbid or highly saline pools or stagnant water with high amounts of organic material.  Spawning generally occurs from late May to early July but sometimes as late as August.  Eggs are quite small  and the females are relatively fecund for members of the species complex, for example one  female was recorded with 2057 eggs.

Conservation
Least Concern.

Utility to humans
Not an angling target due to small size.

References

Galaxias
Taxa named by Tarmo Ain Raadik
Fish described in 2014
Freshwater fish of Australia